More is the second studio album released by pop singer Vitamin C in 2001. The album was not as successful as Vitamin C's previous eponymous album both in terms of chart positions and sales, peaking at number 122 on the Billboard 200 albums chart. Like her debut, the Japanese version of the album contains a bonus track, "This Summer I".

"I Know What Boys Like" is a cover of the 1980s band The Waitresses. The track was penciled as the album's third single, yet never materialized after Elektra Records abandoned promotion of the project.

The second single, "As Long as You're Loving Me" was also included on the 2001 soundtrack to the comedy film See Spot Run.

Track listing

Charts

References

External links
 

2001 albums
Elektra Records albums
Vitamin C (singer) albums